Killaloe, Hagarty and Richards is an incorporated township in Renfrew County in eastern Ontario, Canada, created on July 1, 2000, as a result of an amalgamation of the Township of Hagarty and Richards with the Village of Killaloe.

Communities 
The township comprises the smaller communities of Bonnechere, Killaloe, Round Lake Centre and Wilno.

Demographics 

Parks 
Bonnechere Provincial Park
Bonnechere River Provincial Park
Erskine Provincial Park
Foy Provincial Park
Killaloe Pathways Park
Round Lake Park
Sheryl Boyle Park, on Round Lake
Station Park, in Killaloe
Wilno Heritage Park

Lakes and rivers 
Bonnechere River
Pine River
Golden Lake
Round Lake

Other features 
Killaloe/Bonnechere Airport

See also
List of townships in Ontario

References

External links 



Lower-tier municipalities in Ontario
Municipalities in Renfrew County
Township municipalities in Ontario